Vulvoplasty is a plastic surgery procedure for altering or reconstructing the vulva.

Surgery

Women
Women with congenital disorders or women post-vulvectomy or with genital trauma may receive vulvoplasty for medical reasons.

Women who experience discomfort on her vulva may also receive vulvoplasty.

Sex reassignment surgery

In sex reassignment surgery, some male-to-female transgender patients receive vulvoplasty without vaginoplasty to reconstruct exterior of female genitalia.

References

 

Gynecological surgery
Surgical oncology
Gender-affirming surgery (male-to-female)
Female genital modification
Plastic surgery
Vulva
Pediatric gynecology
Female genital mutilation
Intersex and medicine
Surgical procedures and techniques